Francis Evans is an Australian rules footballer who plays for the Port Adelaide Football Club in the AFL. Nicknamed 'Frank the Tank' Evans was drafted with pick 41 in the 2019 AFL Draft. Evans did not come from the traditional avenue to the AFL. He was plucked from Brunswick NOBS in the VAFA and was a surprise pick to all draft gurus. Evans made his AFL debut on 26 March 2021 in a round 2 clash with Brisbane at GMHBA Stadium. 

After being delisted by the Cats in their premiership year, he signed for the Port Adelaide Football Club as a delisted free agent.

Statistics 
Statistics are correct to the end of the 2022 season

|- style="background-color: #EAEAEA"
! scope="row" style="text-align:center" | 2020
|style="text-align:center;"||| 31 || 0 || 0 || 0 || 0 || 0 || 0 || 0 || 0 || 0 || 0 || 0 || 0 || 0 || 0 || 0

|-
| scope=row | 2021|||| 31 || 1 || 2 || 1 || 7 || 0 || 7 || 4 || 1 || 2 || 1 || 7 || 0 || 7 || 4 || 1
|- style="background:#EAEAEA; font-weight:bold; width:2em"
| scope="row" text-align:center class="sortbottom" colspan=3 | 
Career
| 1
| 2
| 1
| 7
| 0
| 7
| 4
| 1
| 2
| 1
| 7
| 0
| 7
| 4
| 1
|}

References

External links

2001 births
Living people
Geelong Football Club players
Australian rules footballers from Victoria (Australia)